The Greenhorn Range,  el. , is a small mountain range south of Virginia City, Montana in Madison County, Montana.

See also
 List of mountain ranges in Montana

Notes

Mountain ranges of Montana
Landforms of Madison County, Montana